Rhea Silberstein (Pocahontas, Virginia, April 19, 1900 - New York City, 1959) was a Yiddish song composer and teacher of singing. Her best known songs were written with her father and teacher Herman Silberstein. Her best known song "Yohrzeit" (Herman B. Silbershtein) was recorded by Sophie Braslau (Victrola 74595) in 1919 and Yossele Rosenblatt (Victrola 9011-A) in 1926. The song "Yom Kippur" was recorded by Dorothy Jardon (Brunswick 20037-B) in 1922, and "Beloved" by Rosa Ponselle.

References

1900 births
1959 deaths
20th-century composers
American women composers
American composers
Musicians from Virginia
People from Pocahontas, Virginia
20th-century American women musicians
20th-century women composers